The royal consorts of the rulers of the Lorraine region have held varying titles, over a region that has varied in scope since its creation as the kingdom of Lotharingia by the Treaty of Prüm, in 855. The first rulers of the newly established region were kings of the Franks. The Latin construction "Lotharingia" evolved over time into "Lorraine" in French, "Lotharingen" in Dutch and "Lothringen" in German. After the Carolingian kingdom was absorbed into its neighbouring realms in the late ninth century, dukes were appointed over the territory. In the mid-tenth century, the duchy was divided into Lower Lorraine and Upper Lorraine, the first evolving into the historical Low Countries, the second became known as the Duchy of Lorraine and existed well into the modern era.

Queen consort of Lotharingia

Carolingian Dynasty, 855–922

Duchess consort of Lorraine

House of Ardennes-Metz, 959–1033

Duchess consort of Lower Lorraine

Matfriding dynasty, 959–973 

Interregnum (973–977)

Carolingian dynasty, 977–1012

House of Ardennes-Verdun, 1012–1046

House of Luxembourg, 1046–1065

House of Ardennes-Verdun, 1065–1076

Salian Dynasty, 1076–1087
None

House of Boulogne, 1087–1096
None
Interregnum (1096–1101)

House of Limburg, 1101–1106

House of Leuven, 1106–1129

House of Limburg, 1125/29–1139

House of Leuven, 1139–1190

Duchess consort of (Upper) Lorraine

House of Ardennes-Bar, 959–1033

House of Ardennes-Verdun, 1033–1046

House of Ardennes-Metz, 1047–1453

House of Vaudemont, 1473–1737

House of Leszczyński, 1737–1766

The House of Habsburg-Lorraine continued carrying the title as titular Dukes of Lorraine.

See also
Princess of Joinville
List of consorts of Guise
Duchess of Nemours
Duchess of Elbeuf
Duchess of Mayenne
Duchess of Aumale

Notes

Sources

 
 
House of Lorraine
Lorraine
Lorraine
Lorraine, List of royal consorts of